Telioneura jocelynae is a moth in the subfamily Arctiinae. It was described by Hervé de Toulgoët in 1987. It is found in French Guiana.

References

External links

Moths described in 1987
Arctiinae